The 1970 NCAA Men's University Division Ice Hockey Tournament was the culmination of the 1969–70 NCAA University Division men's ice hockey season, the 23rd such tournament in NCAA history. It was held between March 19 and 21, 1970, and concluded with Cornell defeating Clarkson 6-4. All games were played at the Olympic Arena in Lake Placid, New York.

As of 2021 the 1970 Cornell team is the only undefeated NCAA champion in University Division / Division I history.

Qualifying teams
Four teams qualified for the tournament, two each from the eastern and western regions. The ECAC tournament champion and the two WCHA tournament co-champions received automatic bids into the tournament. An at-large bid was offered to a second eastern team based upon both their ECAC tournament finish as well as their regular season record.

Format
The ECAC champion was seeded as the top eastern team while the WCHA co-champion with the better regular season record was given the top western seed. The second eastern seed was slotted to play the top western seed and vice versa. All games were played at the Olympic Arena. All matches were Single-game eliminations with the semifinal winners advancing to the national championship game and the losers playing in a consolation game.

Tournament bracket

Note: * denotes overtime period(s)

Semifinals

(E1) Cornell vs. (W2) Wisconsin

(W1) Michigan Tech vs. (E2) Clarkson

Consolation Game

(W1) Michigan Tech vs. (W2) Wisconsin

National Championship

(E1) Cornell vs. (E2) Clarkson

All-Tournament team
G: Bruce Bullock (Clarkson)
D: Steve Giuliani (Cornell)
D: Dan Lodboa* (Cornell)
F: John Hughes (Cornell)
F: Rick Magnusson (Clarkson)
F: Bob Poffenroth (Wisconsin)
* Most Outstanding Player(s)

References

Tournament
NCAA Division I men's ice hockey tournament
NCAA University Division Men's Ice Hockey Tournament
NCAA University Division Men's Ice Hockey Tournament
Ice hockey in New York (state)
Sports competitions in New York (state)
Sports in Lake Placid, New York